Kepler-42, formerly known as KOI-961, is a red dwarf located in the constellation Cygnus and approximately 131 light years from the Sun. It has three known extrasolar planets, all of which are smaller than Earth in radius, and likely also in mass.

Characteristics
Kepler-42's mass is estimated to be 0.13 times that of the Sun, and a radius 0.17 times that of the Sun, just 1.7 times that of the gas giant Jupiter. Due to its small radius and hence surface area, the luminosity of Kepler-42 is only 0.24% of that of the Sun. Its metallicity is one third of the Sun's. Kepler-42 has an appreciable proper motion of up to 431±8 mas/yr. Due to its small size and low temperature, the star's habitable zone is much closer to the star than Earth is to the Sun.

Planetary system
 
The planetary system comprising three transiting planets was discovered in February 2011 and confirmed on 10 January 2012, using the Kepler Space Telescope. These planets' radii range from approximately those of Mars to Venus. The Kepler-42 system is only the second known system containing planets of Earth's radius or smaller (the first was the Kepler-20 system pictured at left). These planets' orbits are also compact, making the system (whose host star itself has a radius comparable to those of some hot Jupiters) resemble the moon systems of giant planets such as Jupiter or Saturn more than it does the Solar System. Despite these planets' small size and the star's being one of the faintest stars in Kepler field with confirmed planets, the detection of these planets was possible due to the small size of the star, causing these planets to block a larger proportion of starlight during their transits.

Not all of the orbital parameters of the system are known. For example, as with all transiting planets that have not had their properties established by means of other methods such as the radial velocity method, the orbital eccentricity remains unknown.

Based on the orbits of the planets and the luminosity and effective temperature of the host star, the equilibrium temperatures of the planets can be calculated. Estimates for the known planets are in the tables below:

Notes

References

M-type main-sequence stars
Cygnus (constellation)
Planetary systems with three confirmed planets
Planetary transit variables
961
J19285255+4437096
TIC objects